"Don't Leave Home" is the third single released from English singer Dido's second album, Life for Rent (2003). The song was first released as a digital download in various territories on 10 April 2004 before its physical UK release two days later. "Don't Leave Home" peaked at number 25 on the UK Singles Chart and charted for nine weeks. A remix of the song's B-side, "Stoned", by American electronic music duo Deep Dish topped the US Billboard Hot Dance Club Play chart.

Background
"Don't Leave Home" deals with drug addiction. It is written and sung from the point of view of the drug singing to the person who is addicted to it. It was originally a demo recorded for her 1999 album No Angel, but it was included instead on the 2003 album, Life for Rent. It was written and produced by Dido Armstrong and her brother Rollo Armstrong. The song is set in common time composed in a moderate tempo of 80 beats per minute, written in F major with a vocal range from the tone of F4 to the note of C6.

Music video
The Jake Nava-directed music video for "Don't Leave Home" starts with the singer driving on a desert road as it gets dark. Suddenly, she finds herself in front of a forest. Dido leaves the car, drops her suitcase on the ground, and enters the forest. Some of the themes and scenery imply drug addiction, like the hazy affects, the forest filled with mushrooms and hallucinations of spiders and snakes. She leaves the forest and comes across a huge rock-like cliff by the ocean. She sings calmly by the cliff before jumping into the ocean and finds herself on a wide strand with white sand singing out to the ocean. The video ends with the car driving on with broken white lines. The video was shot in Cape Town, South Africa.

"Stoned"
The B-side, "Stoned", was released as a promotional single from Life for Rent. The song tells the story of an unwinding relationship, clouded through drugs. "Stoned" was remixed by Deep Dish; this version peaked at number one on the US Billboard Hot Dance Club Play chart on the week dated 24 January 2004. At the end of 2004, Billboard ranked the remix as the second-most-successful dance club track of year.

Track listings
UK CD single
 "Don't Leave Home"
 "Stoned" (Deep Dish Stoner Remix edit)

European CD single
 "Don't Leave Home" – 3:48
 "Stoned" (Deep Dish Remix edit) – 4:00
 "Don't Leave Home" (video with lyrics)

Credits and personnel
Credits are lifted from the "Don't Leave Home" UK CD single liner notes and the Life for Rent booklet.

Studios
 Recorded at The Ark  (Lincolnshire, England), The Church, Wessex Studios (London, England), and Cubejam (Miami, Florida, US)
 Mixed at The Church (London, England)
 "Don't Leave Home" strings recorded at Air Studios (London, England)
 Mastered at Metropolis Studios (London, England)

Artwork
 Simon Corkin – artwork design
 Bev Jones – photography

"Don't Leave Home" personnel
 Dido – writing (as Dido Armstrong), production
 Rollo – writing (as Rollo Armstrong), production
 Richard Parfitt – guitar
 Sister Bliss – additional keyboards, drum programming
 Makoto Sakamoto – drums
 Mike Hedges – production
 Matthieu Clouard – production assistant
 Ash Howes – mixing
 Phill Brown – recording
 Ger McDonnell – recording
 James Sanger – programming
 Mark Bates – programming assistant
 Pete Davies – programming assistant
 Nick Ingman – string arrangement
 Gavyn Wright – concertmaster
 Miles Showell – mastering

"Stoned" (Deep Dish Remix) personnel
 Dido – writing (as Dido Armstrong), production
 Rollo – writing (as Rollo Armstrong), production
 Lester Mendez – writing, original recordings
 Adam Zimmon – acoustic guitar
 Carlos Paucer – percussion
 Sister Bliss – piano
 Mark Bates – additional keyboards, programming
 Ash Howes – mixing
 Phill Brown – recording
 Steve Sidelnyk – additional drum programming
 Deep Dish – remix and additional production (as Dubfire and Sharam), remix mixing
 Matt Nordstrom – remix mixing

Charts

"Don't Leave Home"

"Stoned" (Deep Dish Remix)

Weekly charts

Year-end charts

Release history

See also
 List of number-one dance singles of 2004 (U.S.)

References

2003 songs
2004 singles
Arista Records singles
Cheeky Records singles
Dido (singer) songs
Music videos directed by Jake Nava
Song recordings produced by Dido (singer)
Song recordings produced by Mike Hedges
Song recordings produced by Rollo Armstrong
Songs about drugs
Songs written by Dido (singer)
Songs written by Rollo Armstrong